Calonectria (anamorph Cylindrocladium) is a genus of ascomycete fungi. Calonectria species are plant pathogens.

Species

Calonectria acicola
Calonectria adianti
Calonectria agnina
Calonectria ambigua
Calonectria angustata
Calonectria apoensis
Calonectria appendiculata
Calonectria asiatica
Calonectria atkinsonii
Calonectria aurea
Calonectria aurigera
Calonectria australiensis
Calonectria avesiculata
Calonectria bahiensis
Calonectria balanseana
Calonectria balansiae
Calonectria bambusina
Calonectria belonospora
Calonectria blumenaviae
Calonectria brachiatica
Calonectria brasiliensis
Calonectria brassicae
Calonectria bryophila
Calonectria callorioides
Calonectria camelinae
Calonectria canadensis
Calonectria capensis
Calonectria celata
Calonectria cephalosporii
Calonectria cerciana
Calonectria chinensis
Calonectria chlorinella
Calonectria chorleyi
Calonectria ciliata
Calonectria cinnabarina
Calonectria circumposita
Calonectria citri
Calonectria clavata
Calonectria coccidophaga
Calonectria coffeae
Calonectria colhounii
Calonectria collapsa
Calonectria colombiana
Calonectria colombiensis
Calonectria copelandii
Calonectria coralloides
Calonectria cremea
Calonectria curtisii
Calonectria curvata
Calonectria curvispora
Calonectria cyathula
Calonectria dearnessii
Calonectria densa
Calonectria diminuta
Calonectria dolichospora
Calonectria duplicella
Calonectria ecuadoriae
Calonectria ecuadorica
Calonectria effugiens
Calonectria equiseti
Calonectria erysiphoides
Calonectria erythrina
Calonectria eucalypti
Calonectria eucalyptina
Calonectria ferruginea
Calonectria fimbriata
Calonectria flavitecta
Calonectria frullaniae
Calonectria fuckelii
Calonectria fulvida
Calonectria geralensis
Calonectria gigaspora
Calonectria gordoniae
Calonectria gracilipes
Calonectria gracilis
Calonectria granulosa
Calonectria guarapiensis
Calonectria gyalectoidea
Calonectria gymnosporangii
Calonectria hawksworthii
Calonectria hederiseda
Calonectria hendrickxii
Calonectria henricotiae
Calonectria hibiscicola
Calonectria hippocastani
Calonectria hirsutellae
Calonectria hoehneliana
Calonectria hongkongensis
Calonectria humicola
Calonectria hurae
Calonectria ignota
Calonectria ilicicola
Calonectria inconspicua
Calonectria indonesiae
Calonectria indusiata
Calonectria insularis
Calonectria intermixta
Calonectria jasmini
Calonectria javanica
Calonectria jimenezii
Calonectria kampalensis
Calonectria kurdica
Calonectria kyotensis
Calonectria lacustris
Calonectria lagerheimiana
Calonectria leguminum
Calonectria leightonii
Calonectria leucophaës
Calonectria leucorrhodina
Calonectria leucothoës
Calonectria levieuxii
Calonectria limpida
Calonectria longisetosa
Calonectria luteofusca
Calonectria macroconidialis
Calonectria madagascariensis
Calonectria malesiana
Calonectria mangiferae
Calonectria massariae
Calonectria meliae
Calonectria meliolae
Calonectria melioloides
Calonectria mellina
Calonectria mexicana
Calonectria mindoensis
Calonectria minuscula
Calonectria minutissima
Calonectria moravica
Calonectria morganii
Calonectria multiphialidica
Calonectria multiseptata
Calonectria muscicola
Calonectria naviculata
Calonectria novae-zelandiae
Calonectria obtecta
Calonectria obvoluta
Calonectria olivacea
Calonectria oodes
Calonectria opalina
Calonectria ophiospora
Calonectria orientalis
Calonectria ornata
Calonectria oudemansii
Calonectria ovata
Calonectria pacifica
Calonectria parasitica
Calonectria pauciramosa
Calonectria pellucida
Calonectria penicilloides
Calonectria perpusilla
Calonectria phycophora
Calonectria pini
Calonectria pini-caribaeae
Calonectria pithecoctenii
Calonectria platasca
Calonectria polizzii
Calonectria polythalama
Calonectria pruinosa
Calonectria pseudonaviculata
Calonectria pseudoreteaudii
Calonectria pseudoscoparia
Calonectria pseudospathiphylli
Calonectria pteridis
Calonectria pyrochroa
Calonectria pyrrhochlora
Calonectria queenslandica
Calonectria quinqueseptata
Calonectria rajasthanensis
Calonectria rehmiana
Calonectria reteaudii
Calonectria richonii
Calonectria rubiginosa
Calonectria rubropunctata
Calonectria rumohrae
Calonectria rutila
Calonectria sasae
Calonectria sceptri
Calonectria scoparia
Calonectria sensitiva
Calonectria soroceae
Calonectria spathiphylli
Calonectria squamulosa
Calonectria sulawesiensis
Calonectria sumatrensis
Calonectria tarvisina
Calonectria terrae-reginae
Calonectria tessellata
Calonectria trichiliae
Calonectria truncata
Calonectria tubaraoënsis
Calonectria ugandae
Calonectria ukolayi
Calonectria ulicis
Calonectria unicaudata
Calonectria uredinophila
Calonectria variabilis
Calonectria varians
Calonectria vernoniae
Calonectria volutella
Calonectria warburgiana
Calonectria xantholeuca
Calonectria zuluensis

Notes and references

Nectriaceae genera
Fungal plant pathogens and diseases
Taxa named by Giuseppe De Notaris